Louis Gallait (9 or 10 May 1810 – 20 November 1887) was a Belgian painter. He lay at the basis of a revival of history painting in Belgium. He earned his reputation especially with the large painting of Charles V's abdication. Gallait's works were esteemed because of their realism, faithfulness of the costumes and color composition of his paintings. He was also a distinguished portrait painter.

Biography

Gallait was born in Tournai, Hainaut, Belgium in 1810. He first studied in his native town under Philippe Auguste Hennequin. In 1832 his first picture, Tribute to Caesar, won a prize at the Salon of Ghent. He then went to Antwerp to continue his studies under Mathieu Ignace van Brée, and in the following year exhibited at the Brussels Salon Christ Healing the Blind. This picture was purchased by subscription and placed in the Tournai Cathedral. Gallait next went to Paris, and he sent to the Belgian Salons Job on the Dunghill, Montaigne Visiting Tasso in Prison, and – to the Brussels Gallery in 1841 — The Abdication of Charles V.  The latter painting, which had been commissioned by the Belgian government, was hailed as a triumph and gained him a European reputation.  The painting was exhibited together with a painting entitled the Compromise of Nobles by another young Belgian painter, Edouard de Bièfve.  Both paintings subsequently travelled to exhibitions in many cities in Europe, and enjoyed a particularly enthusiast reception in Germany where they formed an important impetus for the development of a German school of history painting. Official invitations induced him to settle at Brussels.

Among his accomplished works may be named The Last Honors paid to Counts Egmont and Horn by the Corporations of the Town of Brussels, now at Tournai; The Death of Egmont, in the Berlin gallery; the Coronation of Baudouin, Emperor of Constantinople, painted for Versailles; The Temptation of St Anthony, in the palace at Brussels; The Siege of Antioch, Art and Liberty, Portrait of M. B. Dumortier and The Plague at Tournay, all in the Brussels gallery. A Gipsy Woman and her Children was painted in 1852.  He also served as the director and president of the Académie Royale des Beaux-Arts.

"M. Gallait has all the gifts that may be acquired by work, taste, judgment and determination," wrote Théophile Gautier. His art is that of a man of tact, a skilled painter, happy in his dramatic treatment but superficial. No doubt, this Walloon artist, following the example of the Flemings of the Renaissance and the treatment of Belgian classical painters and the French Romantic school, sincerely aimed at truth. Unfortunately, misled by contemporary taste, he could not conceive of it other than as dressed in sentimentality. As an artist employed by the State, he exercised considerable influence, and for a long time he was the leader of public taste in Brussels.

In 1849 he became correspondent of the Royal Institute of the Netherlands, and the next year he became associated member.

Notable students include Cesare Dell'Acqua. Gallait died in Brussels in 1887.

Honours 
 1881: Grand Cordon in the Order of Leopold.
 Member of the Royal Academy of Science, Letters and Fine Arts of Belgium.

Notes

References

Further reading 
 P. & V. Berko, "Dictionary of Belgian painters born between 1750 & 1875", Knokke 1981, p. 300.

External links
 

1810 births
1887 deaths
Artists from Tournai
Belgian romantic painters
Members of the Royal Netherlands Academy of Arts and Sciences
19th-century Belgian painters
19th-century Belgian male artists
Members of the Royal Academy of Belgium
Honorary Members of the Royal Academy
Recipients of the Pour le Mérite (civil class)